Darul Uloom Nadwatul Ulama (translated as, House of Knowledge and Assembly of Scholars University) is an Islamic seminary in Lucknow, India. It was established by the Nadwatul Ulama, a council of Muslim scholars, on 26 September 1898.

This educational institution draws large number of Muslim students from all over the world. Nadwatul Ulama fosters a diverse range of both scholars and students including Hanafis (the predominant group), Shafi'is and Ahl al-Hadith. Additionally it is one of very few institutes in the region to teach the Islamic sciences completely in Arabic.

History

Nadwatul Ulama was formed with the aim to bring all the sects of Islam together irrespective of some of their differences in beliefs.

Nadwa means assembly and group, it was named so because it was constituted by a group of Indian Islamic scholars from different theological schools. Darululoom is the educational body of Nadwatul Ulama which was formed in Kanpur in 1893. It was eventually shifted to Lucknow in 1898 and the Islamic curriculum was updated with modern sciences, mathematics, vocational training and the addition of an English Department.

On 2 September 1898, the office of the Nadwatul Ulama was shifted to Lucknow. The Darul Uloom Nadwatul Ulama was started on 26 September 1898.

Administration

The manager of Nadwatul Ulama serves as the chancellor of Darul Uloom. In 2000, Rabey Hasani Nadwi became the chancellor.

Hafeezullah was appointed the first principal of the Darul Uloom Nadwatul Ulama. In 2000, when Rabey Hasani Nadawi was appointed the chancellor, Saeed-ur-Rahman Azmi Nadvi became the principal.

Publications
Al-Baas Al-Islami: An international monthly Arabic magazine
Al-raid: a bi-monthly magazine in Arabic.
Tameer e Hayat, a bi-monthly magazine in Urdu
Sachha raahi: Hindi-language magazine

Alumni
The graduates of the Darul Uloom Nadwatul Ulama are usually referred as Nadwis. The alumni include:

 Abul Hasan Ali Hasani Nadwi
 Wadeh Rashid Hasani Nadwi
 Ijteba Nadwi
 Minnatullah Rahmani
 Mohammad Akram Nadwi
 Rabey Hasani Nadwi
 Sajjad Nomani
 Shihabuddin Nadvi
 Abdur Rahman Kashgari Nadwi
 Sultan Zauq Nadvi
 Syed Sulaiman Nadvi
 Syed Ehtisham Ahmed Nadvi
 Wali Hasan Tonki
 Yasin Mazhar Siddiqi
 Salman Husaini Nadwi
 Shihabuddin Nadvi

See also
Darul Uloom Deoband
Nahdlatul Ulama
Jamia Islamia Bhatkal
 Darul Huda Islamic University
Al-Jamiatul Ahlia Darul Ulum Moinul Islam
Darul Uloom Karachi
Jamiah Darul Uloom Zahedan
Madrasah In'amiyyah
Deobandi Islamic movement
List of Deobandi universities
Jamiatul Hidaya, Jaipur
National Institute For Islamic And Contemporary Studies

References

Bibliography

External links
 
Darul Musannefeen Shibli Academi

 
Education in Lucknow
Educational institutions established in 1898
1898 establishments in British India
Islamic universities and colleges
Madrasas in India
Islamic universities and colleges in India
Universities and colleges in Lucknow